is an anime OVA. It is a second, non-hentai adaptation of the game Mizuiro. The story was slightly changed, but it follows the main game's plot climaxes, focusing on Hiyori and Yuki scenarios. With this OVA, the omake "Selling Memorial Event" was released, which features the voice actors talking about their characters.

Story
The protagonist, Kenji, is living with his adopted sister Yuki, who admires her older brother and harbors a slight secret crush on him. One day, after a certain night, a girl—Hiyori, their childhood friend—begin to appear in Kenji's closet. Moreover, her body is transparent, and she has gaps in her memory. As they struggle to figure out the mystery behind Hiyori's state, Kenji begins to realize his forgotten feelings and Yuki suffers with her secret.

Music information
 Opening theme: "Sora no Tsuzuki" by Hiromi Sato
 Ending theme: "Yasashisa no Hajimaru Basho" by Hiromi Sato

See also
 List of television shows based on video games

External links
  Official site
  

2003 anime OVAs
Romance anime and manga

ja:みずいろ#OVA